Catherine Muthoni Coffey is a British singer who was one of the earliest members of British hip hop band Stereo MCs. The single "Elevate My Mind", from the Stereo MCs album Supernatural, in which Coffey was the backing vocalist, was the first British rap single to reach the US pop charts.

The Stereo MCs released their album Connected in 1992, with Coffey featured on the tracks "Connected", "Ground Level" and "Step It Up".

Coffey was featured on the second album by Tricky, Nearly God, released in 1996. She released a solo album in Japan only, Mind the Gap in 1997, on Island Records.

Discography

Albums

Singles and EPs

References 

Year of birth missing (living people)
Living people
British hip hop singers
Place of birth missing (living people)
20th-century Black British women singers
21st-century Black British women singers